The 1954 World Series matched the National League champion New York Giants against the American League champion Cleveland Indians. The Giants swept the Series in four games to win their first championship since , defeating the heavily favored Indians, who had won an AL-record 111 games in the 154-game regular season (a record since broken by the 1998 New York Yankees with 114 and again by the 2001 Seattle Mariners with 116, tying the 1906 Chicago Cubs for the most wins in a season).

"The Catch" occurred during Game 1 of this series, when Giants center fielder Willie Mays snared a long drive by Vic Wertz near the outfield wall with his back to the infield. Utility player Dusty Rhodes had clutch hits in three of the four games, including a pinch-hit walk-off that won Game 1, barely clearing the  right-field fence at the Polo Grounds. Giants manager Leo Durocher, who had managed teams to three National League championships, won his only World Series title as a manager. The Giants, who moved west to San Francisco in 1958, did not win another World Series until 2010.

This was the first time that the Indians had been swept in a World Series and the first time that the Giants had swept an opponent in four games (their 1922 sweep included a controversial tie game). Game 2 was the last World Series and playoff game at the Polo Grounds, and Game 4 was the last World Series and playoff game at Cleveland Stadium.

The National Football League game between the Cleveland Browns and Detroit Lions, scheduled for October 3 at Cleveland Stadium, was postponed to December 19. The same two teams ended up playing on the same field seven days later for the NFL championship. The Browns restored pride for Cleveland by demolishing the two-time defending champion Lions 56-10. 

This was the first World Series since 1948 to not feature the Yankees.

Background
The Indians, by winning the American League pennant, kept the Yankees from having a chance to win their sixth straight series. The last time the Yankees had been absent from the World Series was 1948, when the Indians defeated the Boston Braves to win the championship. This was also the only World Series from 1949 to 1958 in which the Yankees did not participate.

The Indians easily won the 1954 pennant on the strength of the American League's top pitching staff, leading the AL in team earned run average at 2.72 and complete games with 77. Pitchers Early Wynn (23–11, 2.73 earned run average) and Bob Lemon (23–7, 2.72 earned run average) were in top form, with solid contributions from Mike Garcia (19–8, 2.64) and Art Houtterman (15–7, 3.35). Bob Feller, at age 35, could make only 19 starts, and finished at 13–3. Cleveland also had potent hitting, leading the AL in home runs (156) and finishing second in runs scored (746), although the team managed just 30 stolen bases in 63 attempts. Bobby Ávila led the offense with 112 runs and a .341 batting average, while Larry Doby (.272 batting average, 32 home runs, 126 runs batted in) and Al Rosen (.300 batting average, 24 home runs, 102 runs batted in) provided the power. Catcher Jim Hegan made only four errors in 134 games and threw out 44% of would-be base stealers.

The Giants entered the World Series with a top-flight pitching staff as well, with Johnny Antonelli (21–7, 2.30 earned run average), Rubén Gómez (17–9, 2.88) and 37-year-old Sal "The Barber" Maglie (14–6, 3.26). The Giants relied more heavily on relief pitching with Hoyt Wilhelm (12–7, 2.10, 7 saves) and Marv Grissom (10–7, 2.35, 19 saves) rounding out a staff that led the NL in team earned run average at 3.09 and shutouts with 17. Manager Leo Durocher used a solid, consistent lineup with all of his starters, except for the catching position, playing in at least 135 games. Willie Mays (.345 batting average, 41 home runs, 110 runs batted in) led an offense that also featured Don Mueller (.342 batting average), Alvin Dark (.293 batting average, 98 runs), Hank Thompson (26 home runs, 86 runs batted in) and pinch-hitter extraordinaire Dusty Rhodes (.341 batting average).

Summary

Matchups

Game 1

Cleveland got on the board right away against Sal Maglie. Leadoff man Al Smith was hit by a pitch, Bobby Ávila singled and Vic Wertz brought home both with a triple to right. Don Liddle and Marv Grissom held them scoreless for the rest of the game. 

Bob Lemon gave two back in the third on singles by Whitey Lockman and Alvin Dark, a run-scoring groundout by Don Mueller, a walk to Willie Mays and a Hank Thompson run-scoring single. 

Mays saved the day in the eighth after leadoff singles by Larry Doby and Al Rosen led to starting pitcher Maglie being lifted for Liddle. Wertz's drive to deep center field would have scored both if not for Mays' memorable catch. 

Wertz opened the 10th inning with another hard-hit ball in Mays’ direction, which again would have required a great defensive play by the Giants' centerfielder but landed for a double. (Wertz thus ended his afternoon having gone 4-for-5 with three extra-base hits and batting in the Indians’ two runs.) However, this potential 10th-inning rally was to no avail, as the Indians batted only 1-for-16 with runners in scoring position in the game, and went hitless (0-for-13) in such situations after Wertz’s two-run triple in the first inning.

Lemon went all the way for Cleveland, losing it in the 10th when Dusty Rhodes, pinch-hitting for Monte Irvin with two Giants on base, hit a walk-off home run.

Game 2

Once again, the visitors started quickly but could not hold their lead. Al Smith's leadoff home run off Johnny Antonelli put Cleveland up 1–0. Early Wynn preserved that lead, pitching four perfect innings, but in the fifth inning, Willie Mays walked and Hank Thompson singled, and Dusty Rhodes, again pinch-hitting for Monte Irvin, delivered a run-scoring single. Antonelli gave himself the go-ahead run by scoring Thompson on a groundout. New York had just four hits, but Rhodes padded the Giants' lead with a home run leading off the seventh. Their other hit came in the sixth inning on an Alvin Dark leadoff single. Antonelli walked six but struck out nine, pitching a complete game to give the Giants a 2–0 series lead. This was the last postseason game at the Polo Grounds.

Game 3

A huge crowd of 71,555 hoped to see Cleveland get its first win, but things did not go well for the home team. The Indians trailed 1–0 quickly when Whitey Lockman singled, took second on a groundout and scored on a hit by Willie Mays. The run was scored as unearned because of an error by shortstop George Strickland. With the bases loaded in the third, pinch hitter Dusty Rhodes hit a two-run single. An error by pitcher Mike Garcia on Davey Williams' bunt attempt gave the Giants another run to make it 4–0. The Giants added to their lead on run-scoring singles by Wes Westrum off of Art Houtteman in the fifth and by Mays off of Ray Narleski in the sixth. Ruben Gomez gave up just four hits and two runs (a Vic Wertz home run in the seventh and an error by shortstop Alvin Dark on a ground ball by Al Smith), with knuckleballer Hoyt Wilhelm mopping up for the save.

Game 4

Cleveland's slim comeback chances took a beating as the Indians fell hopelessly behind, 7–0. The scoring started on a pair of Cleveland errors in the second inning. A run-scoring double by Mays in the third scored another run. The Giants' four-run fifth inning broke the game wide open. Starter Bob Lemon loaded the bases and was pulled for Hal Newhouser, who faced just two batters, giving up a walk to Thompson and two-run single to Irvin. The Giants added another run in the inning on Wes Westrum's sacrifice fly against Ray Narleski. A brief glimmer of hope for the home team came in the bottom of the fifth with a couple of Giants errors and a Hank Majeski three-run pinch-hit home run, but except for a meaningless run-scoring single by Rudy Regalado in the seventh off starter Don Liddle, the Indians got nothing more as Hoyt Wilhelm and Game 2 starter Johnny Antonelli came on in relief and the Giants completed a four-game sweep. It was the most unexpected sweep in World Series history, with the Indians having a better regular reason record by 14 games. The only other similar discrepancy in a World Series sweep was the 1990 Cincinnati Reds, who swept an Oakland A's team whose regular season record bested theirs by 12 games.

Composite box
1954 World Series (4–0): New York Giants (N.L.) over Cleveland Indians (A.L.)

Records
 Hank Thompson set a World Series record for bases on balls received during a four-game series with 7 and Bob Lemon set a World Series record for bases on balls given up during a four-game series with 8.

Notes

See also
1954 Japan Series

References

External links

 Baseball's Best: 1954 World Series (MLB.com)
 Kodak Presents – Baseball's 25 Greatest Moments, Willie Mays' Catch

World Series
World Series
New York Giants (NL) postseason
Cleveland Indians postseason
World Series
World Series
1950s in Cleveland
World Series
World Series
Baseball competitions in New York City
Baseball competitions in Cleveland
1950s in Manhattan
Washington Heights, Manhattan